Curtain: Poirot's Last Case is a work of detective fiction by British writer  Agatha Christie, first published in the UK by the Collins Crime Club in September 1975 and in the US by Dodd, Mead and Company later in the same year, selling for $7.95.

The novel features Hercule Poirot and Arthur Hastings in their final appearances in Christie's works. It is a country house novel, with all the characters and the murder set in one house. Not only does the novel return the characters to the setting of her first, The Mysterious Affair at Styles, but it reunites Poirot and Hastings, who last appeared together in Dumb Witness in 1937. The fictional detective dies at the end. It was adapted for television in 2013.

It is the last novel published by Christie before her death. Sleeping Murder, published posthumously, is her final novel.

Plot summary
A specific person is unsuspected of involvement in five murders by both the police and family of the victims. In all cases, there was a clear suspect. Four of these suspects have since died (one of them hanged); in the case of Freda Clay, who gave her aunt an overdose of morphine, there was too little evidence to prosecute. Poirot calls on his old friend, the recently-widowed Hastings, to join him in solving this case. Poirot alone sees the pattern of involvement. Poirot, using a wheelchair due to arthritis, and attended by his new valet Curtiss, will not share the name of the previously unsuspected person, using X instead. X is among the guests at Styles Court with them. The old house is a guest hotel under new owners, Colonel and Mrs Luttrell. The guests know each other, with this gathering initiated when Sir William Boyd-Carrington invites the Franklins to join him for a summer holiday stay. The five prior murders took place in the area, among people known to this group.

Elizabeth Cole tells Hastings that she is a sister of Margaret Litchfield, who confessed to the murder of their father in one of the five cases. Margaret has died in Broadmoor Asylum and Elizabeth is stigmatised by the trauma. Three incidents occur in the next few days, showing the imprint of X. First, Hastings and others overhear an argument between the Luttrells. Shortly afterwards, Luttrell wounds his wife with a rook rifle, saying he mistook her for a rabbit. Mrs Luttrell recovers, and the incident has a good effect on their marriage. Next, Hastings is concerned that his daughter Judith spends time with Major Allerton, a married man. While Hastings and Elizabeth are out with birdwatcher Stephen Norton, Norton sees something through his binoculars that disturbs him. Hastings assumes it has to do with Allerton. When his attempts to persuade Judith to give Allerton up merely antagonise her, the worried father plans Allerton's murder. He falls asleep while waiting to poison Allerton, relieved he took no action when he awakes the next day. Last, Barbara Franklin, wife of Judith's employer, Dr Franklin, dies the following evening. She was poisoned with physostigmine sulphate, an extract from the Calabar bean that her husband researches. Poirot's testimony at the inquest, that Mrs Franklin had been upset and that he saw her emerge from Dr Franklin's laboratory with a small bottle, persuades the jury to return a verdict of suicide.

Norton is still concerned over what he saw days earlier when out with Hastings and Cole. Hastings advises Norton to confide in Poirot. They meet in Poirot's room. That night, Hastings is awakened by a noise and sees Norton entering his bedroom. The next morning, Norton is found dead in his locked room with a bullet-hole in the centre of his forehead, the key in his dressing-gown pocket and a pistol nearby.

When Hastings tells Poirot that he saw Norton return to his room the night before, Poirot says it is flimsy evidence, not having seen the face: the dressing-gown, the hair, the limp, can all be imitated. Yet, there is no man in the house who could impersonate Norton, who was not tall. Poirot dies of a heart attack within hours. He leaves Hastings three clues: a copy of Othello, a copy of John Ferguson (a 1915 play by St. John Greer Ervine), and a note to speak to his longtime valet, Georges. After Poirot is buried at Styles, Hastings learns that Judith has all along been in love with Dr Franklin. She will marry him, and leave to do research in Africa. When Hastings speaks to Georges, he learns that Poirot wore a wig and that Poirot's reasons for employing Curtiss were vague.

Four months after Poirot's death, Hastings receives a manuscript in which Poirot explains all. X was Norton, a man who had perfected the technique of which Iago in Othello (and a character in Ervine's play) is master: applying just such psychological pressure as is needed to provoke someone to commit murder, without his victim realising what is happening. Norton had demonstrated this ability, with Colonel Luttrell, with Hastings, and Mrs Franklin. Poirot intervened with sleeping pills in Hastings' hot chocolate that night, to avert a disastrous rash action. Ironically, Hastings had unwittingly intervened in Mrs. Franklin's plan to poison her husband, by turning a revolving bookcase table while seeking a book to solve a crossword clue (Othello again), thus swapping the cups of coffee, so Mrs Franklin poisoned herself. Poirot could not prove this. He sensed that Norton, who had been deliberately vague about whom he had seen through the binoculars, would hint that he had seen Franklin and Judith, to implicate them in the murder of Mrs Franklin, not inadvertent suicide as it was. This explains Poirot's testimony at her inquest, to ensure the police would stop their investigation.

Given his very weak heart, Poirot conceives that he must end the string of murders by killing Norton. Poirot invites Norton for hot chocolate: at their meeting, he tells Norton what he suspects and his plan to execute him. Norton, arrogant and self-assured, insists on swapping cups: anticipating this move, Poirot had drugged both cups, knowing that he had a higher tolerance for a dose that would incapacitate Norton. Poirot moves the sleeping Norton back to his room using the wheelchair: Poirot could walk all along, one reason he needed a new valet who was unaware of that for this last case. Then, being the same height as Norton, he disguises himself as Norton by removing his wig and false moustache, ruffling up his grey hair, then donning Norton's dressing-gown and walking with a limp. Having Hastings establish that Norton was alive after he left Poirot's room, Poirot shoots Norton, leaves the pistol on the table and locks the room with a duplicate key. Poirot then writes his story, and ceases to take his amyl nitrite heart medicine. He cannot say it was right to commit murder, but on balance he was sure he prevented yet more instigated by Norton. His last wish for Hastings is typical for Poirot, the matchmaker: he suggests that Hastings should pursue Elizabeth Cole.

Characters
 Hercule Poirot, the Belgian detective, now withered by age, but still thinking
 Captain Arthur Hastings, Poirot's friend, recently a widower, father of four grown children including Judith
 Curtiss, Poirot's new valet
 Dr John Franklin, a doctor and research chemist, age 35, an idealist of strong character
 Barbara Franklin, his invalid/hypochondriac wife, age 30, an ambitious, scheming woman
 Judith Hastings, Franklin's laboratory assistant and daughter of Captain Hastings, age 21, one year out of university
 Nurse Craven, nurse to Barbara Franklin
 Sir William Boyd Carrington, former governor of a province of India, about 15 years older than Mrs Franklin, friend to her family since she was a child, in England to live as baronet in the house he inherited, once the house is remodelled
 Major Allerton, long estranged from his wife, a smooth-talking womaniser, in his early forties
 Colonel Toby Luttrell, owner of Styles Court, about age 50
 Mrs Daisy Luttrell, his wife
 Elizabeth Cole, age 35, one of three surviving sisters once known by the last name of Litchfield
 Stephen Norton, a grey-haired man of quiet disposition, uses binoculars for bird watching
 Georges, Poirot's long-time valet

Literary significance and reception
In a review titled "The last labour of Hercules", Matthew Coady in The Guardian, on 9 October 1975, wrote that the book was both "a curiosity and a triumph". He repeated the tale of the book being written some thirty years before and then stated that "through it, Dame Agatha, whose recent work has shown a decline, is seen once more at the peak of her ingenuity." Coady called Captain Hastings the "densest of Dr Watsons [but]... never has the stupidity of the faithful companion-chronicler been so cunningly exploited as it is here." Coady summarised the absolute basics of the plot and the questions raised within it and then said,In providing the answers, the great illusionist of crime fiction provides a model demonstration of reader manipulation. The seemingly artless, simplistic Christie prose is mined with deceits. Inside the old, absurd conventions of the Country House mystery she reworks the least likely person trick with a freshness rivalling the originality she displayed nearly 50 years ago in The Murder of Roger Ackroyd. For the egotistic Poirot, hero of some 40 books… it is a dazzlingly theatrical finish.  'Goodbye, cher ami', runs his final message to the hapless Hastings. 'They were good days.' For addicts, everywhere, they were among the best.

Two months later, Coady nominated Curtain as his Book of the Year in a column of critic's choices. He said, "No crime story of 1975 has given me more undiluted pleasure. As a critic, I welcome it, as a reminder that sheer ingenuity can still amaze."

Maurice Richardson in The Observer of 5 October 1975 summed up: "One of her most highly contrived jobs, artificial as a mechanical birdcage, but an unputdownable swansong."

Robert Barnard, in A Talent to Deceive, less favourably writes:Written in the 'forties, designed for publication after Christie's death, but in fact issued just before it.  Based on an idea toyed with in Peril at End House (chapter 9) – a clever and interesting one, but needing greater subtlety in the handling than Christie's style or characterisation will allow (the characters here are in any case quite exceptionally pallid). In fact, for a long-cherished idea, and as an exit for Poirot, this is oddly perfunctory in execution.
It was one of the bestselling books of 1976.

References or allusions
Being their last case together, mention is made of earlier cases. Hastings became involved in the first Styles investigation in 1916, at which time he was thirty years old. He married at the end of the next Poirot novel, The Murder on the Links, mentioned twice in this novel, as Hastings is now a widower.

Poirot mentions that once in Egypt he attempted to warn a murderer before the person committed the crime. That case is the one retold in Death on the Nile. He mentions that there was another case in which he had done the same thing: almost certainly that retold in "Triangle at Rhodes" (published in Murder in the Mews in 1937). In The A.B.C. Murders, Inspector Japp says to Poirot: "Shouldn't wonder if you ended by detecting your own death;" an indication that the idea of Curtain had already formed in the author's mind in 1935. On 6 August 1975, The New York Times published a front-page obituary of Poirot with a photograph to mark his death.

Hastings also mentions "the case of Evelyn Carlisle" as he speculates over a possible hidden financial motive for X's actions, referring to Sad Cypress which centred on the revelation of money as a motivation for the crime.

Sequence of publication in Poirot novels
Christie wrote the novel in the early 1940s, during World War II. Partly fearing for her own survival, and wanting to have a fitting end to Poirot's series of novels, Christie had the novel locked away in a bank vault for over thirty years. The final Poirot novel that Christie wrote, Elephants Can Remember, was published in 1972, followed by Christie's last novel, Postern of Fate. Christie authorised Curtains removal from the vault and subsequent publication. It was the last of her books to be published during her lifetime.

Due to its early date of composition, Curtain makes no mention of Poirot's later cases, in novels published after World War II. Details are only very occasionally anachronistic (such as the mentions of hanging, which had been abolished in Great Britain in 1965). Christie could not know how long she would live nor how popular Poirot would remain. See Hercule Poirot and Miss Marple for further discussion of her views of Poirot. The fifth paragraph in Curtain ("Wounded in the war that for me would always be the war—the war that was wiped out now by a second and more desperate war" says Hastings) marks the passing of time for Hastings, and the long friendship of the two men, as well as making a link to the first Poirot novel.

Though publication was in 1975, and the novel was written over 30 years earlier, the exact time period of the story is unknown, beyond it being summertime. The age of Hastings' daughter puts the story after the Second World War, as does the complete absence of wartime conditions and restrictions (e.g., no mention of rationing or bombing in London), but nothing sets a specific post-war year. The bit of arithmetic to show the story is set post-war starts from the marriage of Arthur Hastings and Dulcie (Cinderella) Duveen at the end of The Murder on the Links (published in 1923), and some years needed for the births of their four children, of whom Judith, age 21, appears to be the youngest. The story was not rewritten to add more specific markers of the years post Second World War, such as car models, clothing styles, or world events. The story clearly ends Poirot's career, as he dies in the novel, using his death for a resolution he had never before considered for a murderer: to become one himself. Poirot's death was announced in The New York Times, a rare honour for a fictional character.

Adaptation for television

The novel was adapted in 2013 starring David Suchet as Poirot. It was the final episode of the final series of Agatha Christie's Poirot, and the first of the final series to be filmed. Hugh Fraser again returned to the role of Hastings, following a ten-year absence; stars such as Alice Orr-Ewing (Judith Hastings), Helen Baxendale (Elizabeth Cole), Anne Reid (Daisy Luttrell), Matthew McNulty (Major Allerton), Shaun Dingwall (Dr Franklin), Aidan McArdle (Stephen Norton) and Philip Glenister (Sir William Boyd-Carrington) were among the other cast. The programme was aired in Britain on 13 November 2013, and later on Acorn TV on 25 August 2014. The adaptation mentions only the Litchfield, Sharples, and Etherington murders. Margaret Litchfield is hanged during the opening credits, whereas in the novel she dies in an asylum. The killer is not labelled 'X' as in the novel, the purpose of the label being achieved in other ways. Otherwise, the adaptation remains extremely faithful to the novel. With the exception of The Mysterious Affair at Styles, set in the First World War, the rest of the ITV Poirot series are set in the 1930s, regardless of when the novels were written, or the contemporary features in each of the novels; this last story sets the year as 1949.

On 19 December 2013, Barnaby Walter of The Edge listed the adaptation and Poirot's death scene at number 2 on the list of the Best TV Drama Moments of 2013. In 2015, Curtain was nominated for Outstanding Television Movie for its 67th Emmy Awards, but eventually lost to Bessie.

Publication history
 1975, Collins Crime Club (London), September 1975, Hardcover, 224 pp 
 1975, Dodd Mead and Company (New York), Hardcover, 238 pp, 
 1976, Pocket Books (New York), Paperback, 280 pp
 1976, Ulverscroft Large-print Edition, Hardcover, 325 pp, 
 1977, Fontana Books (Imprint of HarperCollins), Paperback, 188 pp
 1992, G.K. Hall & Co. large-print edition, Hardcover, 

In the US the novel was serialised in Ladies Home Journal in two abridged instalments from July (Volume XCII, Number 7) to August 1975 (Volume XCII, Number 8) with an illustration by Mark English.

References

External links
Curtain at the official Agatha Christie website

1975 British novels
Collins Crime Club books
Hercule Poirot novels
British novels adapted into television shows
Novels first published in serial form
Novels set in the 20th century
Novels set in Essex
Novels set in hotels
Works originally published in Ladies' Home Journal